McColgan is an Irish surname. Notable people with the surname include:

Aileen McColgan, British academic
Bill McColgan (died 1973), American sportscaster and play-by-play announcer
Eilish McColgan (born 1990), Scottish middle-distance runner
John McColgan, Irish director and co-founder of Riverdance
Liz McColgan (born 1964), Scottish long-distance runner
Mike McColgan, American singer
Peter McColgan (born 1963), Northern Irish athlete
Quinn McColgan (born 2002), American actress

Surnames of Irish origin
Surnames of Ulster-Scottish origin
Anglicised Irish-language surnames